Friedrich Hildebrandt (19 September 1898 – 5 November 1948) was a Nazi Party politician, a Gauleiter and an SS-Obergruppenführer. He was adjudged and executed for war crimes committed during the time of Nazi Germany.

Early life
Hildebrandt was born in Parchim, Mecklenburg-Schwerin. He entered service in the German Army on 19 April 1916 as a "Kriegsfreiwilliger" (literally, "war volunteer") and was assigned to Reserve-Infanterie-Regiment 24 on the Western Front. He was severely gassed in Flanders in 1917, and wounded twice before the end of the First World War. During January 1919, he returned to Mecklenburg and joined the 1.Kompanie/Freikorps "von Brandis" (in Silesia and on the Baltic). He served there until his capture and imprisonment by the Red Army in Riga. He was later released and returned to Germany, being discharged from the German Army as a Vizefeldwebel in January, 1920.

From March, 1920 to June, 1920, Hildebrandt was a member of the Sicherheitspolizei in Halle, with which he participated in the suppression of the "Kapp-Putsch" in March, 1920. In the wake of the Putsch, he was tried for excessive brutality against captured Spartakists in Osterfeld/Weissenfels. Although acquitted, he was dismissed from police service. He found employment as a farm worker and gardener.

Nazi Party career
Hildebrandt joined the Nazi Party in February 1925. On 27 March 1925 he was appointed Gauleiter of Gau Mecklenburg-Lübeck. In September 1925, he became a member of the National Socialist Working Association, a short-lived group of north and northwest German Gauleiter, organized and led by Gregor Strasser, which unsuccessfully sought to amend the Party program. It was dissolved in 1926 following the Bamberg Conference.

Briefly suspended as Gauleiter in July 1930 for criticism of Hitler's alliance with industry, Hildebrandt was reinstated on 31 January 1931. He was elected to the Reichstag in September 1930. After the Nazi seizure of power, he was made Reichsstatthalter (Reich Governor) of the Free State of Mecklenburg-Schwerin, the Free State of Mecklenburg-Strelitz and the City of Lübeck on 26 May 1933. He thus united under his control the highest party and governmental offices in his jurisdictions. On 1 January 1934, the two Free States in his jurisdiction were combined into a unified Mecklenburg. Under the Greater Hamburg Act the City of Lübeck was transferred to Gau Schleswig-Holstein on 1 April 1937 and Hildebrandt's Gau was renamed Gau Mecklenburg.

A member of the SS since 1933, on 30 January 1942 Hildebrandt was promoted to SS-Obergruppenführer, and on 16 November he was named Reich Defense Commissioner for his Gau. After World War II ended, he was arrested and interned by U.S. forces, and tried in the Allied Dachau Trials. He was sentenced specifically in the Airmen's Trial, for contraventions of the Hague Conventions by issuing orders to shoot parachuting U.S. aircrewmen. Friedrich Hildebrandt was then put to death by hanging at Landsberg am Lech on 5 November 1948.

References

Bibliography

External links
 

1898 births
1948 deaths
Dachau trials executions
Executed people from Mecklenburg-Western Pomerania
Gauleiters
German Army personnel of World War I
German National People's Party politicians
German people imprisoned abroad
German Völkisch Freedom Party politicians
Members of the Reichstag of the Weimar Republic
Members of the Reichstag of Nazi Germany
National Socialist Working Association members
Nazi Party officials
Nazi Party politicians
People from Parchim
People from the Grand Duchy of Mecklenburg-Schwerin
SS-Obergruppenführer
20th-century Freikorps personnel
German prisoners of war in World War II held by the United States